The Children of the Company is a science fiction novel by American writer Kage Baker.  It is another in the series concerned with the exploits of The Company, a 24th-century cabal which exploits history for profit with the aid of immortal cyborgs living in the past.

Although presented as a novel, it consists mostly of pieces previously published as short fiction.  The pieces are bound together by the musings, recollections and ambitions of Labienus, one of the cyborgs who occupies a position of extraordinary power and influence.

Plot introduction
In 1863 Labienus has just completed dispatching the tragic cyborg Mendoza to oblivion, having manipulated her into furthering Company interests.  He remembers his origins, and reviews his extensive files on other cyborgs.

Plot summary
Like the cyborg Joseph, Labienus was recruited by the Enforcer Budu when his village was wiped out by the "Great Goat Cult" about 15,000 years ago.  Unlike Joseph, Labienus was destined for high office in the Company, but was first allowed to develop as an arrogant young individual, delighting in terrifying mortals, who are content to live in small villages.  Like many cyborgs, he despises mortals.

Eventually Labienus is told to begin organizing mortals and start civilizing them - the first direct evidence in the Company stories that civilization itself is a result of Company activities.  Labienus creates a city, which may be Nippur, presenting himself as the god En-lil.  After installing a mortal ruler, he moves to Egypt, to run Company operations there.  As part of this, he contacts an operative called Imhotep, who is actually Joseph, to begin the secret cabal which will develop, through the centuries, into Dr. Zeus Inc.

Another figure in the Company is Victor.  He is also one of Budu's recruits, having been born as an Anglo-Saxon.  His mentor in the Company is Aegeus.

Victor's first mission is to supervise the revival of Lewis, who was almost destroyed in an encounter with Homo Umbratilis, strange, dwarf-like people in 5th century Ireland.  Aegeus is anxious to make sure that Lewis remembers nothing, as he is trying to use the strange new race, who are mechanical and scientific geniuses, to further his own ambitions.  These are the same people who pursue Lewis in The Graveyard Game.  Victor is somewhat disgusted by what he has to do, and Labienus is able to use this later to manipulate Victor for his own purposes.

Major themes
Many of the mysteries presented in previous volumes are explained as the product of Labienus' machinations, particularly his rivalry with another powerful cyborg, Aegeus.

Plot elements hinted at in The Graveyard Game are expanded here.  Labienus takes part in the Adonai project, which is the source of Mendoza's troubles in In The Garden of Iden and Mendoza in Hollywood.  He encounters Budu, who has become a rogue intent on wiping out humans who are a menace to others, or to the future of the Earth.

Labienus begins looking for ways to create diseases that can selectively remove groups of people - these apparently include influenza, HIV, and other diseases like Sattes virus which are mentioned in The Graveyard Game.  These are responsible for reducing the mortal population and the birthrate by the 24th century, apparently setting the scene for a cyborg takeover.

External links
 Kage Baker official site - About the novel
 Excerpt from the novel

Novels about time travel
2005 American novels
Novels by Kage Baker
2005 science fiction novels
Tor Books books
Cyborgs in literature
Biological weapons in popular culture